The following is a list of episodes from the BBC television show Scallywagga.

Pilot (2008)

Series 1 (2008)

Series 2 (2010)

Scallywagga